Pierre Steffen Baigorry (born 3 September 1971), better known as Peter Fox, is a German singer, songwriter and musician. He is a member of the German reggae and dancehall band Seeed.

Solo career 
Fox started working on a solo album named Stadtaffe ("Urban Ape") in 2007. The album was released in Germany on 26 September 2008. Monk and DJ Illvibe co-produced the album, and the Deutsches Filmorchester Babelsberg and Cold Steel Drumline contributed to the music.

A sample of the song "Fieber" ("Fever"), which Fox sings with K.I.Z, was released on Fox's MySpace website on 1 November 2007. The first single, "Alles neu" ("Everything New"), was released on 15 August 2008. The second single of the album, "Haus am See" ("House by the Lake"), was released on 17 October 2008.

Fox also had several gigs with other artists, such as the song "Marry Me" by Miss Platnum, "Rodeo" by Sido and Sekundenschlaf by Marteria.

Peter Fox won the Bundesvision Song Contest 2009 on 13 February with his song "Schwarz zu blau" ("Black to Blue"), which is a social realistic representation of his home city Berlin and the transition from nightlife to dawn. The contest was held in Potsdam (the state capital of the previous year's winner Brandenburg).

He has since announced that he will be returning to Seeed due to unwanted stress and attention generated by his highly successful solo album Stadtaffe. His single "Haus am See" was the 82nd best-selling single of 2008 and the 17th best-selling single of 2009 in Germany.

His single "Alles neu" was notably sampled by English rapper Plan B for the track "Ill Manors" in 2012.

Although Peter Fox declared his solo career over in 2009, he released the song "Zukunft Pink" in October 2022.

Personal life 
Fox grew up in Schönow in West Berlin, the son of a German father and a French mother. 

He lives in Berlin's Lichterfelde West neighborhood with his family.

In late 2001, he suffered from facial nerve paralysis that was not treated quickly enough because of a misdiagnosis. The right side of his face is still slightly paralysed, and has since become part of his signature look.

Discography

Studio albums

Live albums

Video albums

Singles

Awards 
 1LIVE "Krone"
 2008 Best Album (Stadtaffe)
 Echo Awards
 2009 Hip-Hop/Urban
 2009 Critics Award
 2009 Producer of the Year
 2010 Album of the Year (Stadtaffe)
 European Border Breakers Award
 2010 European cross border success of the album Stadtaffe

References

External links 

 Official website
 
 Peter Fox at laut.de (in German)

Living people
Participants in the Bundesvision Song Contest
1971 births
German people of French descent
German people of Basque descent
German reggae musicians
Echo (music award) winners
Französisches Gymnasium Berlin alumni
People from Friedrichshain-Kreuzberg
Musicians from Berlin